A Private Affair is a Spanish period drama streaming television series from Bambú Producciones with Teresa Fernández-Valdés as showrunner. Set in Galicia in the 1940s, it is an eight-part murder mystery comedy drama starring Aura Garrido and Jean Reno.

Synopsis
Frustrated by the lack of opportunities for women in a police department, Marina Quiroga the sister of a police commissioner Arturo Quiroga, witnesses a murder and sets out to investigate it on her own with the help of her loyal butler Héctor Hugo.

Episodes
First Season consists of 8 episodes and it deals with murders of prostitutes by the Fleur De Lis Killer

Cast

Production
The series was filmed in 2020 and 2021 around Vigo, Pontevedra, Lérez, and other locations in the Rías Baixas. Initial plans to film in Madrid and Bilbao were abandoned due to the COVID-19 pandemic. In November 2020, it was announced that joining Reno and Garrido in the cast would be Ángela Molina, Álex García, Gorka Otxoa, Tito Valverde, Andrés Velencoso, Pablo Molinero, Sara Sanz, Carlos Villarino, Toño Casais, Nerea Portela and Adrián Ríos.

Release
The series was released on Amazon Prime on 23 September 2022.

References

External links
 

2022 Spanish television series debuts
2020s Spanish drama television series
Spanish-language Amazon Prime Video original programming
Spanish-language television shows
Television series set in the 1940s
Television shows set in Galicia (Spain)
Television shows filmed in Spain
Television series by Bambú Producciones